Catherine Wimp (born 1975) is an international Papua New Guinea lawn bowler.

Bowls career

Commonwealth Games
Wimp represented Papua New Guinea in the singles and pairs at the 2014 Commonwealth Games and the triples and fours at the 2018 Commonwealth Games.

World Championships
In 2020 she was selected for the 2020 World Outdoor Bowls Championship in Australia.

Asia Pacific
Wimp won a silver medal in the pairs with Piwen Karkar at 2019 Asia Pacific Bowls Championships in the Gold Coast, Queensland.

References

Living people
Bowls players at the 2018 Commonwealth Games
Papua New Guinean female bowls players
1975 births
Commonwealth Games competitors for Papua New Guinea